Ivan Koschula is a 1914 German silent drama film directed by Richard Oswald and starring Rudolph Schildkraut, Ernst Ludwig and Hanni Weisse.

It was shot at the Tempelhof Studios in Berlin.

Cast
 Rudolph Schildkraut as Ivan Koschula 
 Ernst Ludwig
 Hanni Weisse
 Robert Valberg

References

Bibliography
 Bock, Hans-Michael & Bergfelder, Tim. The Concise CineGraph. Encyclopedia of German Cinema. Berghahn Books, 2009.

External links

1914 films
Films of the German Empire
German silent feature films
Films directed by Richard Oswald
German black-and-white films
1914 drama films
German drama films
Films shot at Tempelhof Studios
World War I films set on the Eastern Front
Silent drama films
1910s German films
German World War I films